Markashovo is a rural locality (a village) in Sidorovskoye Rural Settlement, Gryazovetsky District, Vologda Oblast, Russia. The population was 15 as of 2002.

Geography 
Markashovo is located 47 km southeast of Gryazovets (the district's administrative centre) by road. Bubeykino is the nearest rural locality.

References 

Rural localities in Gryazovetsky District